Sonic Acts is an organisation for the research, development and production of works at the intersection of art, science and theory. It also commissions and co-produces new works, often in collaboration with international festivals, arts organisations, funders and other partners.

Founded in 1994, Sonic Acts organises the biennial Sonic Acts Festival in Amsterdam, The Netherlands. Over the years, it has established itself as a thematic festival with a strong focus on contemporary and historical developments at the intersections of art, technology, music and science. The festival has invited many well-known artists and musicians such as the Vasulkas, Autechre, Pauline Oliveros, and Florian Hecker, as well as theorists and scientists such as Graham Harman, Saskia Sassen, Timothy Morton, Benjamin H. Bratton, Raphael Bousso, and George Dyson. Each festival edition explores the chosen theme by means of an international conference, a wide range of concerts and performances, exhibitions and screenings, and embraces a broad spectrum of fields, practices and disciplines.

The 25th anniversary edition of Sonic Acts Festival took place in 2019 at Paradiso (Amsterdam), Stedelijk Museum Amsterdam, De Brakke Grond, Muziekgebouw aan het IJ and Arti et Amicitiae. 

More recently, Sonic Acts organises the biennial Sonic Acts Academy, which alternates each year with the festival. The Academy is a new platform that aims to grow, expand, sustain and disseminate stimulating discourse about artistic research. Its first edition took place in 2016 at various locations in Amsterdam. The most recent edition of Sonic Acts Academy was held from 21 to 23 February 2020.

Sonic Acts Festival 

Sonic Acts Festival takes place every two years in a variety of locations in and around Amsterdam. From a small festival, it has grown into a platform for the research, development and presentation of cutting-edge art, science, music and technology, with a large well-attended festival for over 20 years. The festival comprises a varying programme of concerts, a multi-day international conference, an extensive film programme, masterclasses, workshops, an exhibition and site-specific work.

Early years (1994–1998) 
Sonic Acts was founded in 1994 by Paradiso and the ArtScience Interfaculty (Royal Academy of Art, The Hague, and Royal Conservatory of The Hague) to provide a stage for new developments in electronic music and interdisciplinary art forms. The festival was initially organised on a yearly basis in Paradiso, a music venue that had become synonymous with counterculture. In the early years of Sonic Acts, increasing attention was given to demonstrations and workshops, as the festival broadened in scope to focus on the theoretical as well as the practical aspects of artistic developments.

In 1995, Sonic Acts began to introduce new forms of electronic music, such as IDM and electro, as the festival featured performances by English electronic musician Mike Paradinas and ambient techno duo Plaid, among others. In the following years, the festival continued to present new genres of electronic music that were emerging in the early 1990s, with performances by pioneering acts including Robin Rimbaud and English IDM duo Autechre.

Turn of the century (1999–2009) 
The festival was held in August each year until 1999, when it took place from 20 to 23 December. This year also marked enlargement of the festival, with a four-hour boat trip along the IJ to various indoor and outdoor locations in addition to Paradiso. For the first time the festival had a connecting theme, as participating artists took the music of Italian composer Claudio Monteverdi as a starting point for their work. Since 2001 each edition of the festival has been named after its theme. 

In the early to mid 2000s, Sonic Acts shifted its focus to digital arts and their historical contexts. Under the name Sonic Light, the ninth edition of Sonic Acts was devoted to the art of composed light: “the shaping in time of light and colour in a way which is comparable to the way sound is shaped into music”. The festival featured projections by the late German-American filmmaker Oskar Fischinger and Japanese artist Yasunao Tone, as well as Dutch artist Joost Rekveld, who presented a history of abstract animation and light art. Sonic Light also featured renowned and emerging sound artists such as American composer Maryanne Amacher, avant-garde musician Francisco López, Japanese composer Ikue Mori and Canadian electronic musician Venetian Snares.

In 2004, Sonic Acts held its tenth edition of the festival. Titled Unsorted, the festival explored emerging art forms that were rooted in the information society. Particular attention was paid to artists from the labels Raster-Noton and Touch, as well as the breakcore scene. Performing artists included Carl Michael von Hausswolff, Jon Wozencroft, Philip Jeck, BJ Nilsen, Fennesz, Chris Watson and Sickboy. The following edition, titled The Anthology of Computer Art, was held from 23 to 26 February 2006 in Paradiso and De Balie. The festival focussed on the history of computer art and described itself as “a tribute to the work of the early pioneers”. A DVD and a book exploring the theme were published to coincide with the festival. 

Between 2006 and 2010, the link between art, science and technology was developed and the symposium grew. In 2008, the twelfth edition of the festival promised a comprehensive overview of the cinematic experience, proposing that “recent technological developments in digitalisation, higher definition imagery and sound, ever-faster communication networks and new types of portable video players make it necessary to re-address the question of what cinema actually is".

Recent years (2010–present) 
From 2010, Sonic Acts began to fulfil more functions as an organisation and expanded its activities through international collaborations, organising large-scale projects such as the Kontraste festival in Austria and the international research project Dark Ecology. This led to new commissions, workshops, masterclasses and lectures, as well as substantive research and publications, which were incorporated into the festival. Sonic Acts also evolved to explore expansive themes. The title of the 2010 edition of the festival, The Poetics of Space, was derived from the English translation of the book La Poétique de l’Espace (1958) by the French philosopher Gaston Bachelard, while the 2012 edition offered “an intense experience of time” under the title Travelling Time. 

In 2013, Sonic Acts addressed the theme of The Dark Universe, as inspiration was sought from cosmology and physics. Lectures were given by Dutch physicist Gerard ’t Hooft, sociologist Saskia Sassen and American architect Keller Easterling, among others, and new works were presented by artists such as Matthijs Munnik, Yamila Rios and Joris Strijbos. With 2015’s The Geologic Imagination, Sonic Acts shifted its focus to planet Earth. The starting point for the festival was the thesis that we live in a new geological epoch: the Anthropocene. It featured lectures by American philosopher Graham Harman and design theorist Benjamin H. Bratton, as well as work by artists Raviv Ganchrow and Jananne Al-Ani. The festival attracted nearly 9500 visitors.

In 2017, Sonic Acts continued the festival’s gradual change in perspective, exploring what it means to be human against the backdrop of the Anthropocene and the rapidly changing relationship between humans and machines. Titled The Noise of Being, the seventeenth edition of the festival was visited by 10,625 people. Participating artists and speakers included Eyal Weizman, JK Flesh, Roly Porter, Kara-Lis Coverdale, Jennifer Walshe, Le1f, Evian Christ and Christina Vantzou. The opening night featured four new Vertical Cinema films by Susan Schuppli, HC Gilje, Lukas Marxt, and BJ Nilsen & Karl Lemieux. The Noise of Being received positive reviews. The Wire Magazine described the festival as “triggering the imagination necessary for an urgent debate”. Crack Magazine wrote that the festival “kept its audience shifting, rotating, and reversing around the normalised ideas we all share”.
The latest edition of Sonic Acts Festival was held under the name HEREAFTER in 2019 and focused on the current crisis and challenges confronted on a daily basis as well as the consequences they cause. The festival hosted more than 120 artists and speakers including Beatriz Ferreyra, Timothy Morton, Straub-Huillet, Rosi Braidotti, Sondra Perry and Ulrike Ottinger.

Evolution and growth 
Sonic Acts has grown into an organisation that is active throughout the year, producing and presenting work both in the Netherlands and abroad. Recent projects include the three-year art, research & commissioning project Dark Ecology, predominantly taking place in the Arctic region, and its globally touring program Vertical Cinema. Sonic Acts has developed into a hub for an international network of artists, curators and specialists, focusing on future developments as well as the rich histories of art, science and technology.

Sonic Acts Academy 
In 2016 Sonic Acts launched Sonic Acts Academy, a new platform that aims to grow, expand, sustain and disseminate stimulating discourse about artistic research. Its first edition took place from 26 to 28 February at various locations in Amsterdam. Sonic Acts Academy is presented as an exploratory event with a symposium, film screenings, concerts, installations, masterclasses and workshops. The most recent edition of Sonic Acts Academy was held from 21 to 23 February 2020 with artists and speakers including Holly Herndon, No Bra, T. J. Demos, and Terike Haapoja.

Projects

Dark Ecology 
Dark Ecology was a three-year art, research and commissioning project, initiated by Sonic Acts and Kirkenes-based curator Hilde Methi, and in collaboration with Norwegian and Russian partners. Dark Ecology unfolded through research, the creation of new artworks, and a public program that was presented on both sides of the border between Norway and Russia in 2014, 2015 and 2016. The program included lectures, presentations of newly commissioned artworks, guided walks, a discursive program, concert evenings and a workshop.

Vertical Cinema 
Vertical Cinema is a series of ten newly commissioned large-scale, site-specific works by experimental filmmakers and audiovisual artists, which are presented on 35 mm celluloid and projected vertically with a custom-built projector in vertical cinemascope. The 90-minute program premiered at Kontraste Dark As Light Festival 2013 and had its international premiere on 24 January 2014 at International Film Festival Rotterdam. A further four Vertical Cinema films were commissioned for the 2017 edition of Sonic Acts Festival, The Noise of Being.

Kontraste 
Kontraste, a music and art festival in and around Krems an der Donau, Austria, was curated by Sonic Acts in 2011, 2012 and 2013. Kontraste presented sonic and audiovisual experiments, contemporary music and related art forms in a thematic, historical and interdisciplinary context. The programme offered unconventional concerts, live performances, installations, lectures, screenings and presentations.

Re-Imagine Europe 
In May 2017, Sonic Acts announced Re-Imagine Europe. Re-Imagine Europe is a four-year project presented by ten cultural organisations from across Europe, with an aim to respond to the social and political challenges currently facing the continent. Funded by Creative Europe, the project involves artistic residencies, commissions, workshops and symposia.

Editions 
Since 2001 Sonic Acts has named itself after its theme.

 1994 - Sonic Acts I
 1995 - Sonic Acts II
 1996 - Sonic Acts III
 1997 - Sonic Acts IV
 1998 - Sonic Acts V
 1999 - Sonic Acts VI
 2000 - Sonic Acts
 2001 - Point Pixel Programming
 2003 - Sonic Light
 2004 - Unsorted
 2006 - The Anthology of Computer Art
 2008 - The Cinematic Experience
 2010 - The Poetics of Space
 2012 - Travelling Time
 2013 - The Dark Universe
 2015 - The Geologic Imagination
 2017 - The Noise of Being
 2019 - HEREAFTER

References

External links 

Art festivals in the Netherlands
Events in Amsterdam
New media art festivals